I Kadek Agung Widnyana Putra (born 25 June 1998) is an Indonesian professional midfielder for Liga 1 club Bali United and the Indonesia national team. He mostly plays as an attacking midfielder, but he can also play on the central midfielder and wing.

Club career

Bali United
On 18 January 2018, Agung officially signed his first professional contract, a two-year deal with Liga 1 club Bali United after being promoted from Bali United U-19 and introduced as a trial player on 4 December 2017. He has renewed the contract, keeping him part of the team until the end of 2021 season.

Agung made his first-team and league debut for Bali United in a 1–0 win against Mitra Kukar on 15 October 2018 as a substitute for Irfan Bachdim in the 73rd minute. On 25 October, Agung scored his first league goal in the 2018 Liga 1 for Bali United in a 2–2 draw over Borneo at the Kapten I Wayan Dipta Stadium.

International career
Kadek Agung played for the Indonesia under-22 national team in the 2019 AFF U-22 Youth Championship. He received a call to join the senior Indonesian national football team in May 2021. He earned his first cap in a friendly match against Oman on 29 May 2021.
 On 3 June 2021, he made first international goal against Thailand in a 2022 FIFA World Cup qualification, in which Indonesia drew 2–2.

Career statistics

Club

Notes

International

International goals
Goals for Indonesia

Honours

Club
Bali United
 Liga 1: 2019, 2021–22

International 
Indonesia U-22
 AFF U-22 Youth Championship: 2019
Indonesia
 AFF Championship runner-up: 2020

References

External links
 

1998 births
Living people
Indonesian footballers
People from Tabanan Regency
Sportspeople from Bali
Bali United F.C. players
Liga 1 (Indonesia) players
Indonesia youth international footballers
Association football midfielders
Balinese people
Indonesia international footballers